The Djibouti Davis Cup team represents Djibouti in Davis Cup tennis competition.

Governing Body
They are governed by the Fédération Djiboutienne de Tennis.

Last Competition
They have not competed since 2005.

History
Djibouti competed in its first Davis Cup in 1993.

Competition Performance
They have lost all 45 of their ties to date, and have yet to win a rubber.

Last team (2005) 

 Kadar Mogueh
 Fahir Osmar-Obsien
 Abdi-Fatah Abdourahman-Youssouf

See also
Davis Cup

External links

Davis Cup teams
Davis Cup
Davis Cup